Minuscule 345 (in the Gregory-Aland numbering), ε 119 (Soden), is a Greek minuscule manuscript of the New Testament, on parchment. Paleographically it has been assigned to the 11th century. The manuscript was prepared for Church reading. It has full marginalia.

Description 

The codex contains a complete text of the four Gospels on 375 parchment leaves with only some lacunae (e.g. in Matthew 1:1-10 - the ornamented heading). The text is written in two columns per page, in 15 lines per page.

There is also a division according to the smaller Ammonian Sections (in Mark 237 Sections, the last in 16:16), with references to the Eusebian Canons (written below Ammonian Section numbers).

The Synaxarion and Menologion (lacunose) were added by a later hand.

Text 

Kurt Aland did not place the Greek text of the codex in any Category.
According to the Claremont Profile Method it belongs to the textual cluster 163 in Luke 1, Luke 10, and Luke 20 (fragmentary). It creates textual pair with 163.

History 

The manuscript is dated by the INTF to the 11th century.

It was examined by Scholz and Burgon. It was added to the list of New Testament manuscripts by Scholz (1794-1852).
C. R. Gregory saw it in 1886.

The manuscript is currently housed at the Biblioteca Ambrosiana (F. 17 sup.) in Milan.

See also 

 List of New Testament minuscules
 Biblical manuscript
 Textual criticism

References

Further reading 

 J. M. A. Scholz, Biblisch-kritische Reise (Leipzig, 1823), p. 70-73.
 Catalogus graecorum Bibliothecace Ambrosianae (Mediolani 1906), vol. I, pp. 374–375.

Greek New Testament minuscules
11th-century biblical manuscripts
Manuscripts of the Ambrosiana collections